List of villages in Serbia and Montenegro may refer to:

List of populated places in Serbia
List of populated places in Montenegro